Guatemala competed at the 2011 Pan American Games in Guadalajara, Mexico from October 14 to 30, 2011. Guatemala sent 139 athletes in 28 sports.

Medalists

Archery

Guatemala qualified 1 male archer.

Men

Athletics

Men

Track and road events

Field events

Women

Track and road events

Field events

Badminton

Guatemala has qualified 4 men and 4 women.

Men

Women

Mixed

Beach volleyball

Basque pelota

Guatemala qualified a paleta leather pairs 30m fronton (2 athletes) in the sports debut at the Pan American Games.

Bowling

Guatemala qualified a full team of 2 men and 2 women.

Men

Individual

Pairs

Women

Individual

Pairs

Boxing

Canoeing

Men

Women

Cycling

Road Cycling

Men

Track cycling

Omnium

Equestrian

Guatemala qualified an equestrian team.

Dressage

Eventing

Jumping

Individual jumping

Team jumping

Fencing

Guatemala qualified one male épée fencer.

Men

Gymnastics

Artistic
Guatemala qualified a team of 1 man and 1 woman.

Men
Individual qualification & Team Finals

Individual Finals

Women
Individual qualification & Team Finals

Individual Finals

Rhythmic
Guatemala has 1 gymnast.

All Around

Judo

Men

Repechage Rounds

Women

Repechage Rounds

Karate

Guatemala qualified 3 female karate athletes.

Modern pentathlon

Guatemala qualified a full team of 4 athletes (2 men and 2 women).

Women

Racquetball

Women

Roller skating

Colombia has qualified a men's and women's team in the roller skating competition.

Men

Women

Rowing

Men

Women

Sailing

Guatemala qualified a 4 boats and 5 athletes.

Men

Women

Open

Shooting

Men

Women

Squash

Guatemala qualified a full squash team. The team will be made up of 6 athletes (3 men and 3 women).

Men

Women

Swimming

Men

Women

Table tennis

Men

Women

Taekwondo

Guatemala qualified a team of 6 Taekwondo athletes.

Men

Women

Tennis

Men

Triathlon

Men

Women

Weightlifting

Wrestling

Men
Freestyle

References

Nations at the 2011 Pan American Games
P
2011